The North Midland Mounted Brigade (later numbered as the 22nd Mounted Brigade) was a yeomanry brigade of the British Army, formed as part of the Territorial Force in 1908.

It served in the Sinai and Palestine Campaign in the First World War.

In April 1918, it was merged with elements of the 2nd (Sialkot) Cavalry Brigade to form 12th Cavalry Brigade. It remained in Palestine after the end of the war on occupation duties.

Formation

Under the terms of the Territorial and Reserve Forces Act 1907 (7 Edw.7, c.9), the brigade was formed in 1908 as part of the Territorial Force. It consisted of three yeomanry regiments, a horse artillery battery and ammunition column, a transport and supply column and a field ambulance.

As the name suggests, the units were drawn from the northern part of the English Midlands, predominantly Leicestershire, Lincolnshire and Staffordshire.

First World War

North Midland Mounted Brigade
The brigade was embodied on 4 August 1914 and assigned to Third Army of the Central Force. It moved to Norfolk and joined 1st Mounted Division in September 1914 replacing the Nottinghamshire and Derbyshire Mounted Brigade. It remained with 1st Mounted Division until October 1915 when it departed (as a mounted formation) for the Mediterranean.

The Leicestershire Yeomanry left the brigade in late October 1914 and was posted to the British Expeditionary Force (BEF), joining the 7th Cavalry Brigade. It was initially replaced by the Welsh Horse Yeomanry before it transferred to the Eastern Mounted Brigade in February 1915.  In May 1915, the East Riding of Yorkshire Yeomanry joined to bring the brigade back up to a three regiment strength.

The brigade was replaced in 1st Mounted Division by its 2nd Line.  On 27 October 1915, the brigade departed Southampton on RMS Victorian, Mercian and Nessian for Salonika. The destination was changed at sea, and the brigade disembarked at Alexandria between 10 and 20 November 1915, then moved to Cairo. On arrival in Egypt, the North Midland Mounted Brigade was assigned to the Western Frontier Force.

22nd Mounted Brigade

On 31 March 1916, the remaining Mounted Brigades were numbered in a single sequence. As a consequence, the North Midland Mounted Brigade was redesignated as 22nd Mounted Brigade. The 18th Machine Gun Squadron was formed on 8 January 1917.

The brigade joined the ANZAC Mounted Division in February 1917 and took part in the First and Second Battles of Gaza.

The complete brigade was transferred to the newly formed Yeomanry Mounted Division on 6 July 1917, joining it at el Fuqari. From 31 October it took part in the Third Battle of Gaza, including the Battle of Beersheba and the Capture of the Sheria Position. It took part in the Battle of Mughar Ridge on 13 and 14 November and the Battle of Nebi Samwil from 17 to 24 November. From 27 to 29 November, it withstood the Turkish counter-attacks during the Capture of Jerusalem.

12th Cavalry Brigade

In March 1918, the 1st Indian Cavalry Division was broken up in France.  The British units (notably 6th (Inniskilling) Dragoons, 17th Lancers, 1/1st Queen's Own Yorkshire Dragoons and A, Q and U Batteries RHA) remained in France and the Indian elements were sent to Egypt.

By an Egyptian Expeditionary Force GHQ Order of 12 April 1918, the mounted troops of the EEF were reorganised when the Indian Army units arrived in theatre. On 24 April 1918, the Yeomanry Mounted Division was indianized and its title was changed to 1st Mounted Division, the third distinct division to bear this title.

On 24 April 1918, the 22nd Mounted Brigade was merged with elements of the 2nd (Sialkot) Cavalry Brigade:
 the Staffordshire Yeomanry remained with the brigade
 the Lincolnshire Yeomanry and the East Riding of Yorkshire Yeomanry left the brigade on 7 April and were merged to form D Battalion, Machine Gun Corps. It was posted to France, arriving on 1 June
 6th King Edward's Own Cavalry joined from 2nd (Sialkot) Cavalry Brigade
 19th Lancers (Fane's Horse) joined from 2nd (Sialkot) Cavalry Brigade
 18th Machine Gun Squadron remained with the brigade
 22nd Mounted Brigade Signal Troop remained with the brigade
 on 24 April, 1/North Midland Cavalry Field Ambulance merged with Sialkot Cavalry Field Ambulance to form 22nd Combined Cavalry Field Ambulance
 on 26 and 27 April, 3/1st North Midland Mobile Veterinary Section merged with Sialkot Mobile Veterinary Section to form 22nd Mobile Veterinary Section
On 22 July 1918, the 1st Mounted Division was renumbered as the 4th Cavalry Division and the brigade as 12th Cavalry Brigade.  The sub units (Signal Troop, Combined Cavalry Field Ambulance and Mobile Veterinary Section) were renumbered on the same date.

The brigade remained with 4th Cavalry Division for the rest of the war, taking part in the Battle of Megiddo and the Capture of Damascus.

After the Armistice of Mudros, the brigade remained with 4th Cavalry Division in Palestine as part of the occupation forces.  However, demobilization began immediately and by May 1919 most of the British units had been repatriated.  The division was finally broken up in 1921.

Commanders
The North Midland Mounted Brigade / 22nd Mounted Brigade / 12th Cavalry Brigade had the following commanders:

See also

 12th Indian Cavalry Brigade existed at the same time but was unrelated other than having the same number
 2/1st North Midland Mounted Brigade for the 2nd Line formation
 British yeomanry during the First World War

Notes

References

Bibliography
 
 
 
 
 
 

CB12
Cavalry brigades of the British Indian Army
Military units and formations established in 1908
Military units and formations disestablished in 1921
1908 establishments in India